Events in the year 1576 in Norway.

Incumbents
Monarch: Frederick II

Events

Arts and literature
 The first mention of Porsgrunn by the writer Peder Claussøn Friis in his work Concerning the Kingdom of Norway

Births

Deaths

Full date unknown
Heine Havreki, priest (born 1514)